XMA may refer to:

Extreme martial arts, a sport that combines elements from martial arts, acrobatics, and gymnastics, with an emphasis on showmanship
XMA (audio format), Extensible Management Agent, the native Xbox 360 compressed audio format
extended memory area; an addressable region of memory under a DOS Extender
Expanded Memory Adapter, an IBM standard for XT-era expanded memory
XMA, part of the Westcoast Group that distributes IT equipment

See also

 
Xmas (disambiguation)
XM4 (disambiguation)